The 1925 TCU Horned Frogs football team was an American football team that represented Texas Christian University (TCU) as a member the Southwest Conference (SWC) during the 1925 college football season. In its third season under head coach Matty Bell, TCU compiled an overall record of 7–1–1 with a conference mark of 2–0–1 placing second. They shut out five of nine opponents, and outscored all opponents by a total of 133 to 54. TCU played its home games at Clark Field, located on campus in Fort Worth, Texas. The team's captain was Herman Clark, who played quarterback.

Schedule

References

TCU
TCU Horned Frogs football seasons
TCU Horned Frogs football